Crawford Glacier is a tributary glacier which drains the eastern slopes of the Explorers Range between Mount Hager and Mount Ford, Victoria Land, Antarctica. It descends east to join Lillie Glacier south of Platypus Ridge. It was mapped by the United States Geological Survey from surveys and from U.S. Navy air photos, 1960–65, and named by the Advisory Committee on Antarctic Names after Douglas I. Crawford, a biologist at McMurdo Station, 1965–66. The geographical feature lies situated on the Pennell Coast, a portion of Antarctica lying between Cape Williams and Cape Adare.

References
 

Glaciers of Pennell Coast